The 1990 E3 Harelbeke was the 33rd edition of the E3 Harelbeke cycle race and was held on 24 March 1990. The race started and finished in Harelbeke. The race was won by Søren Lilholt of the Histor–Sigma team.

General classification

References

1990 in Belgian sport
1990